Hans Ertl may refer to:

Hans Ertl (cameraman) (1908–2000), German mountaineer, cinematographer and cameraman
Hans Ertl (ice hockey) (1909–?), Austrian Olympic ice hockey player